Dangote Industries Tanzania Limited is a Tanzanian cement company, a subsidiary of Dangote Cement. Dangote Cement operates a three million tonne (annual capacity) plant in Mtwara, southern Tanzania and is the largest cement factory in the country.

The company has also applied to build a 75MW coal powered power plant, adjacent to the factory, to provide reliable electrify to the factory and neighboring community.

Products 
The company only produces cement and has the following products in conventional  bags:
 32.5R Portland Cement 
 42.5R Portland Cement

See also
Dangote Industries Tanzania Thermal Power Station

References

External links 
 Cement Manufactures of Tanzania

Companies of Tanzania
Manufacturing companies established in 2015
2015 establishments in Tanzania
Cement companies of Tanzania